Scolophyllum is a genus of flowering plants belonging to the family Linderniaceae.

Its native range is Indo-China.

Species:

Scolophyllum ilicifolium 
Scolophyllum longitubum 
Scolophyllum spinifidum

References

Linderniaceae
Lamiales genera